Arthur David Mercer (14 February 1918 – April 1986) was an English professional football outside left who played in the Football League for Torquay United.

Personal life 
Mercer was the son of England international footballer David Mercer and the nephew of amateur footballer Richard.

References 

1918 births
1986 deaths
English footballers
Torquay United F.C. players
English Football League players
Association football outside forwards
Footballers from Kingston upon Hull
Dartmouth A.F.C. players